Life (stylized LIFE) is the second studio album by nu metal band Dope.  It was released on November 6, 2001 on Epic Records and Flip Records. Life has sold over 73,000 copies in the United States The album's sound bears a resemblance to those of Marilyn Manson and features some rap metal influences. This was Dope's last album released on Epic and Flip, as the band severed ties over Epic Records' lack of promotion.

Track listing

Credits

Dope
 Edsel Dope – lead vocals, additional guitar, bass, programming, producer, recording/engineering (1), digital editing, layout/design, design, artwork
 Simon Dope – keyboards, samplers, percussion, additional engineering (1)
 Acey Slade – rhythm guitar, backing vocals, additional engineering (1)
 Sloane "Mosey" Jentry – bass
 Racci "Sketchy" Shay – drums
 Virus – lead guitar, backing vocals

Other personnel
 DJ Lethal – turntables (4, 7, 13)
 Jordan Schur – executive producer and A&R
 Josh Abraham – producer, recording/engineering (2–13)
 Anthony "Fu" Valcic – recording/engineering (2–13)
 Kevin Strauwen (Strowen on album) – assistant engineer
 Andy Wallace – mixing
 Steve Sisco – mix down engineer
 Vlado Meller – mastering
 Chip Quigley – management and direction
 Kaz Utsunomiya – A&R for Epic
 Lia Sweet – business affairs
 Joe Serling – legal representation
 John Ditmar – booking
 Chapman Baehler – photography
 Hans Fahrmeyer – photography
 Gene Ambo – photography
 Sara Bowers – layout and design
 Lori Jensen – cover inspiration
 Ron Ransom – artwork
 Dink – artwork
 Darcy J.Watt – artwork
 Darcy Vorhees – artwork
 Jenny Dots – artwork
 Darrin Moore – artwork
 OzZMUDD – artwork

Chart positions

Album

Singles

References 

2001 albums
Dope (band) albums
Albums produced by Josh Abraham
Epic Records albums